Sabrisho III Zanbur was Patriarch of the Church of the East from 1064 to 1072.

Sources 

Sabrisho's patriarchate 
The following account of Sabrisho's patriarchate is given by Bar Hebraeus:

Yohannan VII was succeeded by Sabrisho Zanbur ('the wasp'), the bishop of Nishapur.  His election was pushed through by force by Abu Said the tax-collector of Ispahan, who compelled the bishops and obtained their agreement.  Being anxious to gratify the metropolitan Abdisho of Nisibis, he introduced the custom of allowing the metropolitan of Nisibis to take part in the election of a patriarch.  He was consecrated on a Sunday, on the third day of ab [August] in the year 1372 of the Greeks [AD 1061].  Shortly afterwards he was struck by an apoplexy and lost the use of his limbs.  He fulfilled his office for ten years and died on the third day of nisan [April] in the year 1383 [AD 1072].

See also
 List of patriarchs of the Church of the East

Notes

References
 Abbeloos, J. B., and Lamy, T. J., Bar Hebraeus, Chronicon Ecclesiasticum (3 vols, Paris, 1877)
 Assemani, J. A., De Catholicis seu Patriarchis Chaldaeorum et Nestorianorum (Rome, 1775)
 Brooks, E. W., Eliae Metropolitae Nisibeni Opus Chronologicum (Rome, 1910)
 Gismondi, H., Maris, Amri, et Salibae: De Patriarchis Nestorianorum Commentaria I: Amri et Salibae Textus (Rome, 1896)
 Gismondi, H., Maris, Amri, et Salibae: De Patriarchis Nestorianorum Commentaria II: Maris textus arabicus et versio Latina (Rome, 1899)

Patriarchs of the Church of the East
11th-century bishops of the Church of the East
Nestorians in the Abbasid Caliphate
1072 deaths